Carrabreg i Poshtëm ) or Donji Crnobreg is a village in the Deçan municipality of western Kosovo. It is located in the Dukagjini basin between Deçan and the village of Prilep along the mountainous border with Albania. The majority of the population comprises ethnic Albanians.

Geography
The village, of the "compact type", is located on 600m altitude on the left valley side of the Bistrica e Lloqanit (river), on both sides of the old Deçan–Gjakovë road.

History
Crnveni breg (Црвени брег) was mentioned in the Dečani chrysobull (1330). In the Ottoman defter of 1485, the village had 19 Christian households and one Muslim household. In 1921, there were 58 households and 634 inhabitants. There are ruins of two Orthodox churches in the village, the Church of St. Nicholas, and the Church of St. George, both mentioned in the 1330 chrysobull. After World War II, the villages of Gornji Crnobreg and Donji Crnobreg were one hamlet, Crnobreg (Црнобрег), of Deçan.

References 

Villages in Deçan
Medieval Serbian sites in Kosovo